Banking in Albania, in its present form dating from 1992, consists of the nation's central bank - the Bank of Albania - and an expanding network of secondary banks. The Bank of Albania has the task of supervising the financial system, which currently contains 16 privately owned banks and many other financial institutions.

The function of the banking network
The banking network allows bank transactions to all the network members bank around the country and the world. For example, a network member bank in Albania has an order from its client to transfer funds to a network member bank in the country. The transaction of transferring of funds will be carried out by the two banks and will be validated if it does not violate any banking laws such as money laundering. Such a system forms an important part of the economic and financial system.

History
The Albanian banking network began its development in 1913 with the establishment of the central bank, but the banking network started its real expansion after the fall of Communism, in 1992. Following the new capitalist market economy structure, this network was established as a two-tier system of the central bank and secondary banks. Initially there were three secondary banks formed with state capital: Savings Bank, National Commercial Bank and the Commercial Agricultural Bank. In the following years there has been tremendous increase in the banking system, with the creation of the new private banks, privatization of the existing state owned banks and expansion of the banking network through the improvement of banking legislation.

The Bank of Albania

The Albanian banking network has the first-level independent Bank of Albania as its central hub. The role of the Bank of Albania is to ensure that the financial network functions well. All the second-level banks, micro-finance institutions and other financial institutions are required by law to report to the central bank. The Bank of Albania, as an independent legal institution, ensures the stability of the banking system and protects the interests of depositors and the general public. It also provides a sound banking system, whose activity is transparent and leads to an efficient market economy.

Secondary banks
The nodes of the banking network are represented by the Bank of Albania, 16 nodes representing all second-level banks, 17 nodes representing non-banking financial institutions, 289 nodes representing foreign exchange bureaux and savings and loan associations, and three other associations, giving a total of 325 nodes. All these institutions (nodes) have their headquarters connected with the Bank of Albania, while being the central hubs for their own branches. An example is the National Trade Bank (BKT), which as of 2014 has 61 branches of its own (nodes), so the number of nodes in the network might reach and surpass 1000 nodes as these financial institutions keep expanding their network by adding new nodes in the system.

Interbank network
An interbank network is present and functional in Albania, with ATMs available for money withdrawals or transactions among banks.

References

External links
– Central Bank of Albania – Bank of Albania
Albania Banking Information